The United Alliance of Sabah (abbreviated: GBS) is a political coalition bringing together Sabah-based opposition parties in Malaysia established by Joseph Pairin Kitingan following the fall of the Barisan Nasional coalition in the 2018 Malaysian general election. The new coalition was intended to include the United Sabah Party, Homeland Solidarity Party and remnants of former Sabah BN members, mainly those of the United Malays National Organisation's Sabah branch led by Musa Aman who was rumoured to have intended on joining to PBS. However, no such move has materialised, with Musa Aman remaining a member of UMNO and BN. The GBS Alliance is not yet registered until now. On September 12, 2020, This coalition was later followed by the Sabah People's Alliance (GRS) founded by Datuk Seri Panglima Haji Hajiji Noor. (Malay: Gabungan Rakyat Sabah)

GBS was founded by 5 political parties in Sabah namely Parti Bersatu Rakyat Sabah (PBRS), Parti Bersatu Sabah (PBS), Parti Solidariti Tanah Air-ku Sabah (STAR Sabah), Sabah Progressive Party (SAPP) and UMNO Sabah which has its own autonomy from UMNO Pusat in Sabah.

In February 2020, the parties in the GBS gave their support to the National Alliance (PN) to form a new central government to replace the Pakatan Harapan-led government. PBRS rejoined BN, while SAPP and STAR Sabah joined the National Alliance Party. PBS is back as a single party but supports the National Alliance (PN).

These parties then merged through their respective coalitions to form the Sabah People's Alliance (GRS) to face the Sabah state election in September 2020.

References 

Defunct political party alliances in Malaysia
2018 establishments in Malaysia
Political parties established in 2018